Baboquivari may refer to:

 2059 Baboquivari, a near-Earth asteroid
 Baboquivari Peak Wilderness, a protected area in the U.S. state of Arizona
 Baboquivari National Forest, a former National Forest in the United States
 Baboquivari High School, a high school in Sells, Arizona